Totally may refer to:

Totally (album), album by German band Bad Boys Blue
Totally (company), publishing company

See also

Total (disambiguation)